Tinaya Chantae Evelyn Alexander (born 15 April 1999) is an English footballer who plays as a forward for Reading.

Career

LSU Tigers
In 2017, Alexander joined the LSU Tigers in the United States.

Washington Spirit
Before the 2022 season, she signed for American side Washington Spirit. On 20 March 2022, she debuted for Washington Spirit during a 0–0 draw with Orlando Pride.

Montpellier HSC
On 20 September 2022, the Spirit transferred Alexander for an undisclosed fee to French club Montpellier HSC. She made her debut against Olympique Lyonnais on 23 September 2022.

Reading
On 4 February 2023, Reading announced the signing of Alexander from Montpellier.

References

1999 births
Living people
Women's association football forwards
English expatriate sportspeople in the United States
English expatriate sportspeople in France
English expatriate women's footballers
English women's footballers
Expatriate women's soccer players in the United States
Expatriate women's footballers in France
LSU Tigers women's soccer players
Louisiana State University alumni
National Women's Soccer League players
Washington Spirit players
Division 1 Féminine players
Montpellier HSC (women) players
Footballers from Berkshire
Sportspeople from Reading, Berkshire